USS Situla (AK-140) was a  in the service of the United States Navy in World War II. It was the only ship of the Navy to have borne this name. It is named after the star Situla.

Built in Portland, Oregon

Situla (AK-140), formerly liberty ship SS John Whiteaker (MC hull 1590), was laid down on 9 January 1943 by the Oregon Shipbuilding Corporation, Portland, Oregon; launched on 7 February 1943; sponsored by Miss Anne Whiteaker; and commissioned on 14 January 1944.

World War II 

Situla was accepted from the War Shipping Administration on a bare-boat basis on 2 December 1943; converted to a cargo ship at the San Francisco Navy Yard; fitted out at San Pedro, California; held her shakedown cruise from San Diego on 31 January 1944; and then returned to San Diego on 11 February for further routing. On 17 February, she sailed for Kahului, Hawaii; discharged her cargo; and moved over to Pearl Harbor on 29 February.

South Pacific  

The cargo ship sailed for the Marshall Islands on 21 March and operated from Majuro until 11 May. She returned to Pearl Harbor from 22 May to 19 June and then sailed for Eniwetok, via Kwajalein, to deliver cargo. From 26 September to 21 November, Situla plied between Eniwetok, Kwajalein, Saipan, and Guam. Following yard availability at Pearl Harbor from 21 November to 10 December 1944, the AK returned to her island resupply duty until sailing for Portland, Oregon, on 5 April 1945 for drydocking and overhaul.

On 30 May, Situla stood out of Portland with a load of army cargo for Guam. She was diverted to Saipan and loaded Army Air Force belly tanks destined for Ie Shima, Okinawa Gunto. The ship arrived at Ie Shima on 10 August and was anchored there when the war ended. She remained there until 7 October when she sailed for Yokohama, Japan, arriving on 12 October. On the 30 October, Situla sailed for San Francisco, via Saipan, with all available passenger space filled by Army and Navy discharges.

Post-war decommissioning 

Situla remained on the west coast from 29 November 1945 until 23 April 1946 when she was ordered back to Pearl Harbor for photographic services and layup. She was decommissioned at the Naval Shipyard there on 23 April 1946. The cargo ship returned to San Francisco on 28 November 1947 for disposal. She was stripped and turned over to the Maritime Commission at Suisun Bay on 30 December 1947. Situla was struck from the Navy list on 22 January 1948. She was sold for scrapping, 14 March 1961 (PC-X-599) for $62,139.89 to Union Minerals & Alloys Corp anddismantled by Learner Corp. Oakland, CA., completed 28 September 1961.

Her crew members were eligible for the following medals:
 American Campaign Medal 
 Asiatic-Pacific Campaign Medal
 World War II Victory Medal

References

External links
 

 

Crater-class cargo ships
World War II auxiliary ships of the United States
Ships built in Portland, Oregon
1943 ships